McCourt (also rendered MacCourt, McCord, McCoard, McCard and occasionally Courtney) is an Irish surname associated with the province of Ulster. It derives from the Old Gaelic name "MacCuarta" or sometimes "MacCuairt", translating as "the son of Cuairt", a byname meaning "visitor".  The name has associations with the equally Old Gaelic name of Muircheartaigh, which may be perceived through the Anglicized pronunciation of that surname as McCourt (or McCord).

McCourt is a surname of ancient origin, being first recorded in the Kingdom of Oriel, which comprised mainly the modern counties of Armagh and Monaghan, with parts of Down, Louth and Fermanagh, in the 9th century. Colla Uais, their ancestor, was King of Ireland from 322 to 326. Kinsmen of the O’Carroll Princes they were Chiefs of a considerable territory in the north of County Louth near the Armagh border. As a result of the Anglo-Norman invasions in the late 12th century, their patrimony was greatly diminished, but most remain in or near their homeland. A branch of the family who settled in County Tyrone, gave their name to the village of Cappagh (in Gaelic Ceapach  Mhic Cuarta) near Dungannon in County Tyrone This is written in Gaelic as "Ceapach Mhic Cuarta", which translates as an outlying settlement of the Mac Cuarta's, one remote from the main sept.

As early as the 16th century, the surname was recorded as far south as Munster, where in several County Cork documents, it was equated with Rothe, i.e. a lease dated 1484, listed Elias Roothe alias Mc Cuarta. (viz. Muircheartaigh). Others of the "sept" are found in the Hearth Money Rolls of County Armagh for 1664, under the spelling Mac Quorte and Father Ronan, in his Irish martyrs, gives the anglicized form as Mac Worth. The name has gained a permanent place in the literary history of Ireland, due to James Mac Court or Séamas Dall Mac Cuarta [1647–1733] whose poems were collected and published by Rev. L. Murray. Known as Courtney as well as McCourt, he was a friend of Turlough O’Carolan; and he has been described as "the greatest of the northern Gaelic Poets".

In Northeastern Ulster, some McCourts may descend from the MacMhuircheartaigh (Son of the sea ruler) family, a sept of the powerful Clan Stuart of Bute, from the west of Scotland.  Their surname, in addition to McCourt, has become McCurdy.  Brought to Ireland by the Stewarts when they arrived at Ballintoy, having lost their lands in Bute in the mid 16th century, the name is now numerous in the glens and north coast of Antrim.

Notable people 
Carmel McCourt (born 1958), British singer
Dale McCourt (born 1957), Canadian ice hockey player
David McCourt, Irish–American entrepreneur
E. Hansford McCourt (1909–1992), American politician
Ellen McCourt (born 1984), English doctor and trade unionist
Frank McCourt (1930–2009), American-Irish author
Frank McCourt (executive) (born 1953), American businessman and sports executive
Hoxton Tom McCourt (born 1961), English musician
James McCourt (writer) (born 1941), American novelist
James McCourt (TV host), English entertainer
Jamie McCourt (born 1953), American attorney, sports executive, and ambassador
Jim McCourt (born 1944), Irish boxer
John McCourt (1874–1924), American lawyer and judge
John McCourt (footballer) (1883–1948), Scottish footballer
Kevin McCourt (businessman) (died 2000), Irish businessman
Leah McCourt (born 1992), Irish mixed martial artist
Malachy McCourt (born 1931), Irish-American actor, writer, and politician
Patrick McCourt (born 1983), Irish footballer
Richard McCourt (born 1976), English actor and TV presenter
Ryan McCourt (born 1975), Canadian artist
Sean McCourt, American actor
Séamas Dall Mac Cuarta (c. 1647–1733), Irish poet

References

Surnames of Irish origin
Anglicised Irish-language surnames